Seys is a surname. Notable people with the surname include:

Corneel Seys (1912–1944), Belgian soccer player
Dylan Seys (born 1996), Belgian football player
Evan Seys (1604–1685), Welsh-born British lawyer and member of parliament
Roger Seys (died 1599), Welsh lawyer and politician